Shongar Dzong is a town in Mongar District in southeastern-central Bhutan.

References

External links
Satellite map at Maplandia.com

Populated places in Bhutan